is a private Junior college in Fukui, Fukui, Japan.

History 
The college was founded in 1971 as a nursing school. It was authorized as a special training college in 1976, and it developed into an integrated special school of  medical technology. The specialized school was developed and was reorganized, with the junior college in 2006.

External links
 Fukui College of Health Sciences

Universities and colleges in Fukui Prefecture
Educational institutions established in 2006
Japanese junior colleges
Private universities and colleges in Japan
Fukui (city)
2006 establishments in Japan